Reshmi Menon is an Indian actress who predominantly appears in Tamil films.

Career
In 2008, Menon was pursuing Visual Communication at Women's Christian College, Chennai, a course she enrolled in because she "loved the media". She accompanied her friend to the auditions for the Prakash Raj production, Inidhu Inidhu (2010), and was offered the lead role. She shot for the film while still studying, and had to skip classes at WCC to work in the film. Reshmi was one of several newcomers to make their acting debuts in Inidhu Inidhu. A remake of the Telugu film Happy Days, it had her reprising the role originally played by Tamannaah. Critics were divided on her performance. While The Hindu felt that she was a "cute find", Sify's critic said that she "sticks out like a sore thumb". Sekhar Kammula, the director of the original film, stated that he forgot Tamannaah and could only see Reshmi, when he saw the remake.

Reshmi then acted in the independent film Om Obama directed by Janaki Vishwanathan. The film was shot over a period of 35 days in 2010, but remains unreleased.

In 2011, she had her second release, Theneer Viduthi, the directorial debut of music director S. S. Kumaran. Reshmi played a "bubbly and talkative girl" alongside her Inidhu Inidhu co-star Adith Arun. The film, a rural comedy set in Bodinayakkanur, received mixed reviews; considering Reshmi's performance, Sify stated that she "settles into her character so comfortably that one believes that she is indeed from Bodinayakanur".

Her next release, the comedy-thriller Burma, came three years later. It received generally favorable reviews and her performance was well received, although critics felt that her role was insubstantial.

Her latest films include the fantasy thriller Urumeen, Kirumi, a "drama with elements of a psychological thriller", Natpadhigaram 79, a tale of friendship directed by Ravichandran and the romance flick Hyderabad Love Story, her maiden Telugu venture.

Personal life 
Menon got engaged to actor Bobby Simha on 8 November 2015, and they married on 22 April 2016. Their daughter, Mudhra, was born on 2 May 2017. On 11 November 2019 she gave birth to their second child a baby boy.

Filmography
All films in Tamil; Otherwise noted

As producer
Vasantha Mullai (2023)

References

External links

Indian film actresses
Actresses in Tamil cinema
Living people
1989 births
Women's Christian College, Chennai alumni